{{DISPLAYTITLE:C27H44O2}}
The molecular formula C27H44O2 may refer to:

 Alfacalcidol
 Calcifediol, or calcidiol
 Colestolone, or 5α-cholest-8(14)-en-3β-ol-15-one
 Gefarnate
 7α-Hydroxy-4-cholesten-3-one